Darlien Bajaziti (born 7 July 1994) is an Albanian footballer who played as a forward for Besa Kavajë in the Albanian First Division. He is the son of  former Albania international player Dashnor Bajaziti.

References

Living people
1994 births
Footballers from Kavajë
Albanian footballers
Besa Kavajë players
FK Dinamo Tirana players
KF Laçi players
Kategoria e Parë players
Kategoria Superiore players
Association football forwards